Thomas Sproson (9 December 1903 – 1976) was an English professional footballer who played as a goalkeeper.

Career statistics
Source:

References

1903 births
1976 deaths
Footballers from Stoke-on-Trent
English footballers
Association football goalkeepers
West Bromwich Albion F.C. players
Port Vale F.C. players
Burton United F.C. players
English Football League players